Judah Johnson is an American rock band from Detroit, Michigan.

History
Judah Johnson formed in 1999 and first began recording in the summer of 2000 with Don Dixon. After touring regionally, they released their debut EP on Flameshovel Records in 2001. Following a series of lineup changes in early 2002, the band began recording material for a full-length in the summer of that year. The LP Kisses and Interrogation was released in 2003, and in 2006 a follow-up full-length, Be Where I Be, was issued. That same year, the band performed at North East Sticks Together.

Members
Current
Daniel Johnson - vocals, guitar
Charlie Koltak - drums
Steven Nistor - keyboards
Rodrigo Palma - bass

Former
Brian Pierson - guitar (1999–2002)
Zach Roberts - bass (1999–2002)
Nate Cavalieri - keyboards (1999–2002)

Discography
Judah Johnson EP (Flameshovel Records, 2001)
Kisses and Interrogation (Flameshovel, 2003)
Be Where I Be (Flameshovel, 2006)

References

Indie rock musical groups from Michigan
Musical groups established in 1999
Musical groups from Detroit
1999 establishments in Michigan
Flameshovel Records artists